The 2010 season was Club Social y Deportivo Colo-Colo's 79th season in the Chilean Primera División. This article shows player statistics and all official matches that the club played during the 2010 season.

Players

Squad information

Squad stats

Players out

Disciplinary records

Players in / out

In

Out

Competitions

Primera División

Standings

Results summary

Results by round

Copa Libertadores

Competitive

Primera División

Copa Libertadores
Group stage

Copa Chile
First round

3 - 3 on points. Curicó won 4 - 3 on penalties

Copa Sudamericana
First round

3 - 3 on global. Universitario Sucre won on away goals

See also 
 Colo-Colo

References

External links 
 Official club site

Colo-Colo seasons
Colo-Colo
Colo